Martín Ezequiel Andrizzi (born 5 June 1976 in Buenos Aires) is an Argentine retired footballer.

Club career

Andrizzi started his playing career in 1994 with All Boys, in 1997 he was signed by Boca Juniors and then spent the next few years out on loan to several different clubs. In 2000 Andrizzi played 5 games for Boca in the Copa Mercosur scoring 1 goal.

In 2001 Andrizzi joined Estudiantes but found his first team opportunities limited. In 2002, he joined newly promoted Arsenal de Sarandí.

In 2003 Andrizzi joined Lanús and in 2004 he played for Mexican club Dorados de Sinaloa. Andrizzi returned to Argentina in 2005 where he played for Banfield, including appearances in the Copa Libertadores in 2007.

In 2007 Andrizzi returned for a second spell with Arsenal de Sarandí, establishing himself as an important member of the first team.

Andrizzi scored the goal Arsenal needed to win the 2007 Copa Sudamericana.

Coaching career
Andrizzi started his coaching career at the end of December 2018 when it was confirmed, that he had been appointed manager of Club Almirante Brown from 1st January 2019. In July 2019, he joined newly appointed manager Sergio Lippi at Club Olimpo as an assistant coach. However, Andrizzi resigned from the position due to health problems.

In February 2020, Andrizzi returned to Boca Juniors as a youth coach.

Titles

References

External links
 Argentine Primera statistics at Fútbol XXI  
 

1976 births
Living people
Footballers from Buenos Aires
Argentine footballers
Association football wingers
All Boys footballers
Unión de Santa Fe footballers
Argentine expatriate sportspeople in Ecuador
San Martín de San Juan footballers
Dorados de Sinaloa footballers
Boca Juniors footballers
Estudiantes de La Plata footballers
Arsenal de Sarandí footballers
Club Atlético Lanús footballers
Club Atlético Banfield footballers
San Martín de Tucumán footballers
Club Atlético Belgrano footballers
S.D. Quito footballers
Argentine Primera División players
Liga MX players
Argentine expatriate footballers
Expatriate footballers in Mexico
Expatriate footballers in Ecuador
Argentine expatriate sportspeople in Mexico
Argentine football managers